The top tier in Indian football today is the Indian Super League, replacing the I-League for the 2022–23 season. The list includes records from National Football League or I-League (1996–97 – 2021–22) and the Indian Super League (2017–18 – present). Since the 1996–97 season, the first year of top flight football, 20 different individual players have been named top scorer.

Top scorers

By season

By number of seasons as top scorer 

Bold denotes players currently playing in the Indian Super League.
Italics denotes players still playing professional football.

By club

By nationality

All-time Top Scorers with over 50 goals

Bold denotes players currently playing in the Indian Super League.
Italics denotes players still playing professional football.

Clubs top scorer in top tier

Top Indian scorers

Bold denotes players currently playing in the Indian Super League.
Italics denotes players still playing professional football.

Records
All records listed below pertain to league matches played in the National Football League, I-League (2006–07 to 2021–22) and the Indian Super League (2017–18 to present) only.

 Most goals in a season: 32 Ranti Martins, Dempo (2011–12)
 Most goals in a season by an Indian (Joint record): 14 Bhaichung Bhutia, JCT (1996–97)  Mohammed Rafi, Mahindra United (2009–10)   Sunil chhetri, Bengaluru (2013–14, 2017–18) 
 Most individual goals in a match: 6 Ranti Martins for Dempo v Air India 30 May 2011
 Fastest goal in a match: 9 seconds Komron Tursunov for TRAU v Real Kashmir 10 January 2021
 Most number of hat-tricks: Odafa Onyeka Okolie (13)
 First ever goal scorer: Raman Vijayan for East Bengal v Mohammedan Sporting 17 December 1996
 First ever golden boot winner: Bhaichung Bhutia, 14 goals for JCT in 1996–97 season
 Youngest ever goal scorer: Rohit Danu 16 years, 5 months and 27 days for Indian Arrows v Aizwal 5 January 2019
 Youngest ever hat-trick scorer: Bungo Singh 18 years and 3 days for Air India v SBT 5 March 2001

See also
Indian Super League Golden Boot
I-League Golden Boot
List of Indian Super League records and statistics
List of I-League records and statistics

References

Records and statistics
I
Super League
I-League lists